Pic Luigi Amedeo is a mountain in the Mont Blanc massif in the Aosta Valley, Italy. It lies on the Brouillard ridge to the summit of Mont Blanc, and is only reachable via an ascent of that ridge.

The mountain is named after Prince Luigi Amedeo, Duke of the Abruzzi, after whom the Abruzzi Spur on K2 is also named.

The first ascent of the peak was by G.B. and G.F. Gugliermina with the Aostan guide Joseph Brocherel on 20 July 1901. The first ascent of the entire Brouillard ridge including Pic Luigi Amedeo was by Karl Blodig, Humphrey Owen Jones, Geoffrey Winthrop Young with the guide Josef Knubel of St. Niklaus in the canton Valais on 9 August 1911.

See also

List of 4000 metre peaks of the Alps

References

Mountains of Aosta Valley
Mountains of the Alps
Alpine four-thousanders
Mont Blanc massif